Henry Michael Barnard (18 July 1933 – 18 December 2018) was an English first-class cricketer and professional footballer.

Biography
As a cricketer, Barnard played for Hampshire as a right-handed batsman and right-arm medium-pace bowler. As a footballer, he played in the Football League for Portsmouth as an inside left.

Barnard attended Portsmouth Grammar School, He played cricket for Hampshire from 1952 to 1966, playing 276 first-class matches for the county and 9 one-day matches. In 1961, he played in 13 championship matches, scoring 558 runs at an average of 29.36, as Hampshire won the County Championship for the first time. He retired from first-class cricket at the end of the 1966 County Championship season.

Barnard played for non-league club Gosport Borough before joining Portsmouth. He made his Portsmouth debut on 26 December 1953, in a 1–1 draw against Tottenham Hotspur in the First Division. He played until the 1958–59 Football League season, scoring 26 goals from 127 first-team appearances in all competitions, 25 from 116 in the Football League. He later played for non-league club Chelmsford City.

His family was of Jewish origins.

See also
List of select Jewish cricketers

References

External links

1933 births
2018 deaths
English cricketers
Hampshire cricketers
Cricketers from Portsmouth
People educated at The Portsmouth Grammar School
English footballers
English Jews
Association football forwards
Gosport Borough F.C. players
Portsmouth F.C. players
Chelmsford City F.C. players
English Football League players
Jewish British sportspeople
Jewish cricketers
Poole Town F.C. players
Deaths from cerebrovascular disease
Footballers from Portsmouth
Neurological disease deaths in England